is a passenger railway station  located in the city of   Amagasaki Hyōgo Prefecture, Japan. It is operated by the private transportation company Hanshin Electric Railway. It is the nearest station to Hanshin Koshien Stadium.

Lines

Station layout
This station has two elevated island platforms and a side platform serving four tracks, and an additional side track is located in the west of the platforms. There was also a side platform to the north of Track 1 till autumn 2014. Ticket gates are located at the east and the west, and there is stadium exit from the side platform serving Track 4 to the west.

Every year from 2011 until 2014, the two side platforms were closed for removal work from November till mid-March and boarded from late March till October for the events. One to the north of Track 1 was removed in November 2014 to locate new Track 1 and widen the eastbound platform, completed on February 21, 2015. The other was also removed to locate new Track 4 and the new side platform and widen the westbound platform, completed on March 14.

Two elevators were situated on October 26, 2013, one for each platform connecting to the west gate.

Platforms

Renovation
On June 8, 2011, Hanshin Electric Railway announced plans to renovate Koshien Station from autumn 2011, with work completed by spring 2017. Of four platforms at the station, a side platform for unloading eastbound trains was removed and the remaining three platforms were widened to accommodate an elevator connecting the west gate on each platform and another elevator connecting the east gate on each of the two platforms used for boarding trains. The west gate was widened to ease access to Hanshin Koshien Stadium, covering a camphor tree in the south of the station. The east entrance is situated near the east gate making it easier for passengers to access the eastern area of the station. A large roof covers the center of the platforms and the tracks.

History
1 August 1924 - Koshien Station opened as an extra station.
1 July 1926 - The Koshien Line opened from this station to Hama-Koshien.
16 July 1926 - The station on the Main Line became an all-season station.
25 June 1928 - The Koshien Line was extended from this station to Kami-Koshien.
24 April 1949 - Baseball specters fell over like a file of dominoes, killing one and injuring eleven.
6 May 1975 - The Koshien Line was abandoned.
17 January 1995 - The Great Hanshin earthquake hit the Main Line and operations were temporarily halted.
The train operation resumed on the Main Line from Umeda to Koshien on January 18, from Koshien to Ogi on January 26, and on the whole line on June 26.
21 December 2013 - Introduction of station numbering: Koshien designated as station number HS-14.

Passenger statistics
In fiscal 2019, the station was used by an average of 44,690 passengers daily

Surrounding area

East
LaLaPort Koshien
KidZania Koshien
Ito Yokado
Koshien Police Station
Nishinomiya Municipal Naruo Library
Hanshin Bus southbound stops
for Koshien Hachibancho
for  via Koshien Hachibancho / for  via Hamakoshien
for Hamakoshien
for Mukogawa-danchi
for Takasu-higashi
for Naruohama
airport limousine for Osaka International Airport (operated by Hanshin Bus and Osaka Airport Transport)

West
Hanshin Koshien Stadium
Daiei Koshien
Hanshin Bus northbound stops
for 
for Hanshin Nishinomiya via 
for Takarazuka via Koyanosato and Takarazuka City Hospital
for Amagasaki-Hamada Depot and -eki-kita via Nishi-Oshima
Novotel Koshien

Gallery

See also
List of railway stations in Japan

References

External links

 Kōshien Station website 

Railway stations in Hyōgo Prefecture
Railway stations in Japan opened in 1924
Hanshin Main Line
Nishinomiya